Sagi Ramakrishnam Raju Engineering College Bhimavaram (or SRKREC) is a co-educational, Autonomous and a private engineering college in Bhimavaram, Andhra Pradesh, India.

History
It was formed in the 1980s to provide a better quality technical education to students. The college is located on a 30 acres plot in Chinna-Amiram on the Bhimavaram - Juvvalapalem state highway, 2 miles from Bhimavaram town, that is well known as "Second Bardoli" and is famous for "Pancharamas" (Somaramam). It was founded in the year 1980 by donations from Sagi Rama Krishnam Raju.

The college was accorded permanent affiliation by Jawaharlal Nehru Technological University, Kakinada from 2017 for four-year degree courses. The college was registered under the section 2 (f) of the UGC Act and it is eligible to receive central assistance under section 12 (b) of UGC. The College is recognized by the All India Council for Technical Education (AICTE) and the Institution of Engineers and accredited by National Board of Accreditation (NBA).

Description
The college has 6 departments which includes Electrical & Electronics Engineering, Computer Science & Engineering, Civil Engineering, Information Technology, Mechanical Engineering, and Electronics & Communication Engineering.

Rankings

Sagi Ramakrishnam Raju Engineering College was ranked in the 251-300 among engineering colleges by the National Institutional Ranking Framework (NIRF) in 2020.

References

External links 
 

Engineering colleges in Andhra Pradesh
Universities and colleges in West Godavari district
Colleges affiliated to Andhra University
1980 establishments in Andhra Pradesh
Educational institutions established in 1980